American rapper and songwriter Roddy Ricch has been nominated for nine Grammy Awards, winning one for Best Rap Performance for "Racks in the Middle". "The Box" and "Rockstar" received each three nominations at the 63rd Annual Grammy Awards, including for Song of the Year and Record of the Year, respectively. Ricch has won an American Music Award, two BET Hip Hop Awards, and two BET Awards—including for Album of the Year for Please Excuse Me for Being Antisocial. Apple Music awarded him Album and Song of the Year in 2021.


Awards and nominations
{| class="wikitable sortable plainrowheaders" style="width: auto;"
|-
! scope="col" | Award
! scope="col" | Year
! scope="col" | Recipient(s) and nominee(s)
! scope="col" | Category
! scope="col" | Result
! scope="col" class="unsortable"| 
|-
| rowspan=8| American Music Awards
| rowspan=8| 2020
| rowspan=3| Himself
| Artist of the Year
| 
| rowspan=8|
|-
| New Artist of the Year
| 
|-
| Favorite Male Artist — Rap/Hip-Hop
| 
|-
| "Rockstar" 
| Collaboration of the Year
| 
|-
| "The Box"
| Favorite Song — Pop/Rock
| 
|-
| Please Excuse Me for Being Antisocial
| Favorite Album — Rap/Hip-Hop
| 
|-
| "The Box"
| rowspan=2| Favorite Song — Rap/Hip-Hop
| 
|-
| "Rockstar" 
| 
|-
| rowspan=2| Apple Music Awards
| rowspan=2| 2020
| Please Excuse Me for Being Antisocial
| Album of the Year
| 
| rowspan=2|
|-
| "The Box"
| Song of the Year
| 
|-
| rowspan=5| BET Awards
| rowspan=5| 2020
| Please Excuse Me for Being Antisocial
| Album of the Year
| 
| rowspan=5|
|-
| rowspan=2| Himself
| Best Male Hip-Hop Artist
| 
|-
| Best New Artist
| 
|-
| rowspan=2| "The Box"
| Video of the Year
| 
|-
| Viewer's Choice Award
| 
|-
| rowspan=15| BET Hip Hop Awards
| rowspan=2| 2019
| Himself
| Best New Hip Hop Artist
| 
| rowspan=2|
|-
| Feed Tha Streets II
| Best Mixtape
| 
|-
| rowspan=11| 2020
| rowspan=2| Himself
| Hip Hop Artist of the Year
| 
| rowspan=11|
|-
| Best Live Performer
| 
|-
| "Rockstar" 
| rowspan=2| Best Hip Hop Video
| 
|-
| "The Box"
| 
|-
| "Rockstar" 
| rowspan=2| Song of the Year
| 
|-
| "The Box"
| 
|-
| Please Excuse Me for Being Antisocial
| Hip Hop Album of the Year
| 
|-
| "Rockstar" 
| rowspan=2| Best Collaboration
| 
|-
| "Ballin'" 
| 
|-
| "Rockstar" 
| Sweet 16: Best Featured Verse
| 
|-
| "Rockstar (BLM Remix)" 
| Impact Track
| 
|-
| rowspan=2| 2021
| “Lemonade (Remix)” (Internet Money feat. Don Toliver & Roddy Ricch)
| Sweet 16: best featured verse
| 
| rowspan=2|
|-
| “Late At Night,”
| Song of the year
| 
|-
| rowspan=7| Billboard Music Awards
| rowspan=3| 2020
| Please Excuse Me for Being Antisocial
| Top Rap Album
| 
| rowspan=3|
|-
| rowspan=2| Himself
| Best New Artist
| 
|-
| Top Rap Artist
| 
|-
| rowspan=4| 2021
| rowspan=4| "Rockstar" 
| Top Collaboration
| 
| rowspan=4|
|-
| Top Streaming Song
| 
|-
| Top Hot 100 Song
| 
|-
| Top Rap Song
| 
|-
|-
| rowspan="6"| BMI R&B & Hip Hop Awards
| rowspan="6"| 2021
| Himself
| Songwriter of the Year
| 
| rowspan="6"|
|-
| Ballin
| rowspan="5"| Most Performed Songs
| 
|-
| High Fashion
| 
|-
| Rockstar
| 
|-
| The Box
| 
|-
| The Woo
| 
|-
| rowspan="10"| Grammy Awards
| rowspan=3| 2020
| "Ballin'" 
| Best Rap/Sung Performance
| 
|rowspan=3|
|-
| rowspan="2"| "Racks in the Middle" 
| Best Rap Performance
| 
|-
| rowspan=2| Best Rap Song
| 
|-
|rowspan=6| 2021
| rowspan=3| "The Box"
| 
| rowspan=6| 
|-
| Song of the Year
| 
|-
| rowspan=2| Best Melodic Rap Performance
| 
|-
| rowspan=3| "Rockstar" 
| 
|-
| Record of the Year
| 
|-
| Best Rap Song
| 
|-
| 2022
| Donda – Kanye West (as a featured artist)
| Album of the Year
| 
| 
|-
| rowspan=7| iHeartRadio Music Awards
| rowspan=7| 2021
| rowspan=3| Himself
| Male Artist of the Year
| 
| rowspan=7| 
|-
| Hip-Hop Artist of the Year
| 
|-
| Best New Hip-Hop Artist
| 
|-
| rowspan=2| "Rockstar" 
| Song of the Year
| 
|-
| rowspan=3| Hip-Hop Song of the Year
| 
|-
| "The Box"
| 
|-
| "High Fashion" 
| 
|-
| MOBO Awards
| 2020
| Himself
| Best International Act
| 
| 
|-
| rowspan=5| MTV Europe Music Awards
| rowspan=5| 2020
| rowspan=2| Himself
| Best New
| 
| rowspan=5| 
|-
| Best Hip-Hop
| 
|-
| "The Box"
| rowspan=2 |Best Song
| 
|-
| rowspan=2| "Rockstar" 
| 
|-
| Best Collaboration
| 
|-
| rowspan="5"| MTV Video Music Awards
| rowspan="5"| 2020
| Himself
| PUSH Best New Artist
| 
| rowspan="5"|
|-
| rowspan=2| "The Box"
| Song of the Year
| 
|-
| Best Hip-Hop
| 
|-
| "Rockstar" 
| rowspan=2| Song of Summer
| 
|-
| "The Woo" 
| 
|-
| rowspan=3| People's Choice Awards
| rowspan=3| 2020
| Himself
| The New Artist of 2020
| 
| rowspan=3| 
|-
| rowspan=2| "Rockstar" 
| The Song of 2020
| 
|-
| The Collaboration of 2020
| 
|-
| rowspan=2| Soul Train Music Awards
| rowspan=2| 2020
| "The Box"
| rowspan=2| Rhythm & Bars Award
| 
| rowspan=2| 
|-
| "Rockstar" 
| 
|-
| Varietys Hitmakers
| 2020
| Himself
| Breakthrough Artist of the Year
| 
| 
|-

References

Lists of awards received by American musician